The Taruarau River is a river in the Hawke's Bay region of the eastern North Island of New Zealand. It flows south for 40 kilometres from the Kaimanawa Range, before flowing into the Ngaruroro River 60 kilometres from that river's outflow into Hawke Bay.

Rivers of the Hawke's Bay Region
Rivers of New Zealand